Deprea is a genus of flowering plants belonging to the family Solanaceae.

Its native range is Costa Rica to Western South America.

The genus name of Deprea is in honour of Alexandre-Armand Desprez (1747–1829), a French doctor and botanist.

Known species:

Deprea abra-patriciae 
Deprea altomayoensis 
Deprea andersonii 
Deprea auccana 
Deprea bitteriana 
Deprea bongaraensis 
Deprea cardenasiana 
Deprea chotanae 
Deprea cuyacensis 
Deprea cyanocarpa 
Deprea darcyana 
Deprea dilloniana 
Deprea ecuatoriana 
Deprea glabra 
Deprea grandiflora 
Deprea harlingiana 
Deprea hawkesii 
Deprea kann-rasmussenii 
Deprea longipedunculata 
Deprea lutea 
Deprea macasiana 
Deprea maculatifolia 
Deprea micrantha 
Deprea nieva 
Deprea nubicola 
Deprea orinocensis 
Deprea oxapampensis 
Deprea paneroi 
Deprea parviflora 
Deprea pauciflora 
Deprea pecaensis 
Deprea pedrazae 
Deprea peruviana 
Deprea physalidicalyx 
Deprea pilosa 
Deprea pomacochaensis 
Deprea psilophyta 
Deprea pumila 
Deprea purpurea 
Deprea purpureocarpa 
Deprea sachapapa 
Deprea sagasteguii 
Deprea sapalachensis 
Deprea sawyeriana 
Deprea schjellerupiae 
Deprea steyermarkii 
Deprea subtriflora 
Deprea sylvarum 
Deprea teresitae 
Deprea toledoana 
Deprea vasquezii 
Deprea zakii 
Deprea zamorae

References

Solanaceae
Solanaceae genera